Artashat, Hellenized as Artaxata and Artaxiasata, was a major city and commercial center of ancient Armenia which served as the capital of the Kingdom of Armenia from its founding in 176 BC to 120 AD, with some interruptions. It was founded during reign of King Artaxias I (Artashes), the founder of the Artaxiad dynasty. Its ruins are located in the Ararat Province of modern-day Armenia, on the left bank of the Araks River, at the site of the monastery of Khor Virap. It was destroyed and rebuilt several times from the 1st to the 5th centuries AD, before finally being abandoned.

Name 
The name of the city is of Iranian origin. Artaxata/Artashat can be interpreted as meaning "the joy of Arta (truth)," although it is actually a shortening of Artaxšas-šāt, meaning "the joy of Artaxias," as reflected in the alternative Greek form Artaxiasata. Artaxata was named after its founder, Artaxias I, just as the cities of Arshamashat, Eruandashat, and Zarishat were named after their respective founders (see also: -shat). It was briefly renamed Neroneia in the first century AD after it was rebuilt by Tiridates I of Armenia with the help of the Roman emperor Nero.

History

Antiquity
King Artaxias I founded Artaxata as his new capital in 176 BC in the  canton of the province of Ayrarat, on a peninsula of nine hills at the confluence of the Araks and Metsamor rivers. Archaeological evidence may indicate that Artaxata was built upon the remains of an older Urartian settlement. The story of its foundation is given by the Armenian historian Movses Khorenatsi: "Artashes [Artaxias] traveled to the confluence of the Yeraskh and Metsamor [rivers] and, taking a liking to the hill there, he chose it as the location of his new city, naming it after himself." The Greek historians Plutarch and Strabo relate an apocryphal story according to which the site of Artaxata was chosen on the advice of the Carthaginian general Hannibal. There is, however, no direct evidence to support this story. 

Artaxias I built Artaxata's citadel on the height later called Khor Virap (best known as the location where Gregory the Illuminator was imprisoned by Tiridates III of Armenia) and added other fortifications, including a moat. The remains of the great walls of the city and some of its buildings are still visible today. Strabo and Plutarch describe Artaxata as a large and beautiful city and call it the "Armenian Carthage." Excavations have revealed that Artaxata was a major urban center with paved streets, numerous bathhouses, markets, workshops and administrative buildings. The city had its own treasury, mint and customs house. A focal point of Hellenistic culture in Armenia, Armenia's first theater was built here. Movses Khorenatsi writes that numerous copper pagan statues of the gods and goddesses of Anahit, Artemis and Tir were brought to Artaxata from the religious center of Bagaran and other regions, and that Jews from the former Armenian capital of Armavir were relocated to the new capital. Due to its advantageous position, Artaxata soon became an important junction on the trade routes linking Persia and Mesopotamia with the Caucasus, the Black Sea ports and Asia Minor, contributing to its growth and prosperity, as well as that of the surrounding region. The city had a population of several thousand, consisting of Armenians, Greeks, Jews, and Syrians who worked as artisans, craftsmen, and merchants.

Wars against Romans and Persians

During the reign of Tigranes II, the Armenian kingdom was expanded to include many territories to the south and west, ultimately reaching the Mediterranean Sea. Due to the remoteness of Artaxata within the expanded empire, Tigranes built a new capital called Tigranocerta in the region of Arzanene. However, in 69 BC, the Roman general Lucullus invaded Armenia, defeated Tigranes' forces in the outskirts of Tigranocerta and sacked the new capital. As the harassed Roman forces continued to move northeast in pursuit of the Armenian king, a second prominent battle took place, this time near Artaxata where, according to Roman sources, Tigranes II was defeated once again, although Lucullus was forced to turn back to Mesopotamia by the threat of mutiny and never took the city. Artaxata successfully withstood an assault by the Parthians allied with Tigranes's son, but then faced another attack by Pompey. In order to save Artaxata, Tigranes submitted to the Romans and gave up most of the territories which he had conquered.

The city remained a hotly contested military target for the next two centuries. Mark Antony marched on Artaxata in 34 BC and took King Artavasdes II captive. in 58–59 AD, It was occupied and razed to the ground by Capadocian legions under the Roman general Gnaeus Domitius Corbulo during the first, short-lived, Roman conquest of Armenia. After Emperor Nero recognized Tiridates I as king of Armenia in 66 AD, he granted him 50 million sesterces and sent architects and construction experts to aid in the reconstruction of the ruined city. The city was temporarily renamed Neroneia, in honor of its sponsor.

The Roman emperor Trajan conquered Armenia in 115/6 AD and briefly made it a Roman province. The Romans established a garrison at Artaxata during this time, as has been proved by the discovery of Latin inscription there mentioning Trajan. After his death, the Romans led by Statius Priscus invaded Armenia and destroyed Artaxata in 163/64 AD. After this, Artaxata was replaced by Vagharshapat as the capital of Armenia, at least temporarily. In the mid-3rd century, during the reign of Khosrov III the Small, the royal court was moved to Duin. In the late 360s, Artaxata was thoroughly destroyed by the invading army of Sasanian king Shapur II, along with the other cities of Armenia. Following the partition of Armenia between Sasanian Iran and the Eastern Roman Empire, Artaxata became one of three authorized points for trade between the two empires.

In 449, prior to the Armenian rebellion of 450–451, the political and religious leaders of Christian Armenia convened a council at Artaxata to discuss the threats of the Sasanian king Yazdegerd II. During the rebellion, the city was destroyed again by pro-Sasanian Armenian forces. With the rise in prominence of Duin as the capital and chief city of Armenia, Artaxata rapidly declined. The changing courses of the Araks and Mestamor rivers and consequent flooding probably led to the settlement's final abandonment.

The exact location of ancient Artaxata was identified during the 1920s, with archaeological excavations beginning in 1970.

References

Bibliography

Further reading
 
 

Former capitals of Armenia
Archaeological sites in Armenia
Forts in Armenia
Buildings and structures in Ararat Province
Ararat Province